Her Gilded Cage is a 1922 American silent drama film directed by Sam Wood and starring Gloria Swanson. The film was based on the play The Love Dreams by Elmer Harris and Anne Nichols.

Plot
As described in a film magazine review, in order to support her crippled sister Jacqueline and possibly finance a cure, Suzanne Ornoff accepts a position as a cabaret dancer. An American traveling in Paris falls in love with her, but when he learns of her profession, he will have nothing to do with her. Broken hearted, she goes to the United States were she meets his brother, and the brother falls in love with her, too. Although he is warned that the young woman is not worthy, he disregards his brother's warning, and continues his romance with her. When it is discovered that Suzanne is doing all of this for her sister, the objections are overcome and it ends happily for all persons concerned.

Cast
 Gloria Swanson as Suzanne Ornoff
 David Powell as Arnold Pell
 Harrison Ford as Lawrence Pell
 Anne Cornwall as Jacqueline Ornoff
 Walter Hiers as Bud Walton
 Charles A. Stevenson as Gaston Petitfils

Preservation
With no prints of Her Gilded Cage located in any film archives, it is a lost film.

References

External links

Film stills at Glorious Gloria Swanson website
Still with Swanson at www.hollywoodpinups.com

1922 films
1922 drama films
1922 lost films
Silent American drama films
American silent feature films
American black-and-white films
American films based on plays
Famous Players-Lasky films
Films directed by Sam Wood
Lost American films
Lost drama films
Paramount Pictures films
1920s American films